The Communauté de communes de Blangy-sur-Bresle is a former communauté de communes in the Seine-Maritime département (in the Normandy région) and also in the Somme département (Hauts-de-France région) of France. It was created in December 2001. On 18 January 2007, 5 communes of the Somme, (Bouillancourt-en-Séry, Bouttencourt, Maisnières, Tilloy-Floriville and Vismes) joined the Communauté. They were followed by 4 more communes from Somme in 2009. It was merged into the new Communauté de communes interrégionale Aumale - Blangy-sur-Bresle in January 2017.

Composition 
This Communauté de communes comprised 19 communes in Seine-Maritime and 9 communes in Somme:

Aubermesnil-aux-Érables
Bazinval
Biencourt
Blangy-sur-Bresle
Bouillancourt-en-Séry
Bouttencourt
Campneuseville
Dancourt
Fallencourt
Foucarmont
Frettemeule
Guerville
Hodeng-au-Bosc
Maisnières
Martainneville
Monchaux-Soreng
Nesle-Normandeuse
Pierrecourt
Ramburelles
Réalcamp
Rétonval
Rieux
Saint-Léger-aux-Bois
Saint-Martin-au-Bosc
Saint-Riquier-en-Rivière
Tilloy-Floriville
Villers-sous-Foucarmont
Vismes

See also 
Communes of the Seine-Maritime department
Communes of the Somme department

References 

Blangy-sur-Bresle
Blangy-sur-Bresle